Shipbuilding is the construction of ships and other floating vessels. It normally takes place in a specialized facility known as a shipyard. Shipbuilders, also called shipwrights, follow a specialized occupation that traces its roots to before recorded history.

Shipbuilding and ship repairs, both commercial and military, are referred to as "naval engineering". The construction of boats is a similar activity called boat building.

The dismantling of ships is called ship breaking.

History

Pre-history
The earliest known depictions (including paintings and models) of shallow-water sailing boats is from the 6th to 5th millennium BC of the Ubaid period of Mesopotamia. They were made from bundled reeds coated in bitumen and had bipod masts. They sailed in shallow coastal waters of the Persian Gulf.

4th millennium BC

Ancient Egypt
Evidence from Ancient Egypt shows that the early Egyptians knew how to assemble planks of wood into a ship hull as early as 3100 BC. Egyptian pottery as old as 4000 BC shows designs of early fluvial boats or other means for navigation. The Archaeological Institute of America reports that some of the oldest ships yet unearthed are known as the Abydos boats. These are a group of 14 ships discovered in Abydos that were constructed of wooden planks which were "sewn" together. Discovered by Egyptologist David O'Connor of New York University, woven straps were found to have been used to lash the planks together, and reeds or grass stuffed between the planks helped to seal the seams. Because the ships are all buried together and near a mortuary belonging to Pharaoh Khasekhemwy, originally they were all thought to have belonged to him, but one of the 14 ships dates to 3000 BC, and the associated pottery jars buried with the vessels also suggest earlier dating. The ship dating to 3000 BC was about 75 feet (23 m) long and is now thought to perhaps have belonged to an earlier pharaoh. According to professor O'Connor, the 5,000-year-old ship may have even belonged to Pharaoh Aha.

Austronesia

The first true ocean-going vessels were built by the Austronesian peoples during the Austronesian expansion (c. 3000 BC). From Taiwan, they first settled the island of Luzon in the Philippines before migrating onwards to the rest of Island Southeast Asia and to Micronesia by 1500 BC, covering distances of thousands of kilometers of open ocean. This was followed by later migrations even further onward; reaching Madagascar in the Indian Ocean and New Zealand and Easter Island in the Pacific Ocean at its furthest extent, possibly even reaching the Americas.

Austronesians invented unique ship technologies like catamarans, outrigger boats, lashed-lug boatbuilding techniques, crab claw sails, and tanja sails; as well as oceanic navigation techniques. They also invented sewn-plank techniques independently. Austronesian ships varied from simple canoes to large multihull ships. The simplest form of all ancestral Austronesian boats had five parts. The bottom part consists of a single piece of hollowed-out log. At the sides were two planks, and two horseshoe-shaped wood pieces formed the prow and stern. These were fitted tightly together edge-to-edge with dowels inserted into holes in between, and then lashed to each other with ropes (made from rattan or fiber) wrapped around protruding lugs on the planks. This characteristic and ancient Austronesian boatbuilding practice is known as the "lashed-lug" technique. They were commonly caulked with pastes made from various plants as well as tapa bark and fibres which would expand when wet, further tightening joints and making the hull watertight. They formed the shell of the boat, which was then reinforced by horizontal ribs. Shipwrecks of Austronesian ships can be identified from this construction as well as the absence of metal nails. Austronesian ships traditionally had no central rudders but were instead steered using an oar on one side.

The ancestral Austronesian rig was the mastless triangular crab claw sail which had two booms that could be tilted to the wind. These were built in the double-canoe configuration or had a single outrigger on the windward side. In Island Southeast Asia, these developed into double outriggers on each side that provided greater stability. The triangular crab claw sails also later developed into square or rectangular tanja sails, which like crab claw sails, had distinctive booms spanning the upper and lower edges. Fixed masts also developed later in both Southeast Asia (usually as bipod or tripod masts) and Oceania. Austronesians traditionally made their sails from woven mats of the resilient and salt-resistant pandanus leaves. These sails allowed Austronesians to embark on long-distance voyaging.

The ancient Champa of Vietnam also uniquely developed basket-hulled boats whose hulls were composed of woven and resin-caulked bamboo, either entirely or in conjunction with plank strakes. They range from small coracles (the o thúng) to large ocean-going trading ships like the ghe mành.

The acquisition of the catamaran and outrigger technology by the non-Austronesian peoples in Sri Lanka and southern India is due to the result of very early Austronesian contact with the region, including the Maldives and the Laccadive Islands via the Austronesian maritime trade network (the precursor to both the Spice Trade and the Maritime Silk Road), estimated to have occurred around 1000 to 600 BCE and onwards. This may have possibly included limited colonization that have since been assimilated. This is still evident in Sri Lankan and South Indian languages. For example, Tamil paṭavu, Telugu paḍava, and Kannada paḍahu, all meaning "ship", are all derived from Proto-Hesperonesian *padaw, "sailboat", with Austronesian cognates like Javanese perahu, Kadazan padau, Maranao padaw, Cebuano paráw, Samoan folau, Hawaiian halau, and Māori wharau.

3rd millennium BC

Ancient Egypt
Early Egyptians also knew how to assemble planks of wood with treenails to fasten them together, using pitch for caulking the seams. The "Khufu ship", a 43.6-meter vessel sealed into a pit in the Giza pyramid complex at the foot of the Great Pyramid of Giza in the Fourth Dynasty around 2500 BC, is a full-size surviving example which may have fulfilled the symbolic function of a solar barque.  Early Egyptians also knew how to fasten the planks of this ship together with mortise and tenon joints.

Indus Valley
The oldest known tidal dock in the world was built around 2500 BC during the Harappan civilisation at Lothal near the present day Mangrol harbour on the Gujarat coast in India. Other ports were probably at Balakot and Dwarka. However, it is probable that many small-scale ports, and not massive ports, were used for the Harappan maritime trade. Ships from the harbour at these ancient port cities established trade with Mesopotamia. Shipbuilding and boatmaking may have been prosperous industries in ancient India. Native labourers may have manufactured the flotilla of boats used by Alexander the Great to navigate across the Hydaspes and even the Indus, under Nearchos. The Indians also exported teak for shipbuilding to ancient Persia. Other references to Indian timber used for shipbuilding is noted in the works of Ibn Jubayr.

2nd millennium BC

Austronesia
The crab claw sail was developed by Austronesians within Island Southeast Asia at around 1500 BC, from the more primitive V-shaped square sails. This is believed to have spurred the invention of the characteristic outriggers of Austronesian vessels, as well as later derivative Austronesian fore-and-aft rigs like the tanja sail and the junk sail.

Mediterranean
The ships of Ancient Egypt's Eighteenth Dynasty were typically about 25 meters (80 ft) in length and had a single mast, sometimes consisting of two poles lashed together at the top making an "A" shape. They mounted a single square sail on a yard, with an additional spar along the bottom of the sail. These ships could also be oar propelled. The ocean- and sea-going ships of Ancient Egypt were constructed with cedar wood, most likely hailing from Lebanon.

The ships of Phoenicia seem to have been of a similar design.

1st millennium BC

Austronesia
Austronesians established the Austronesian maritime trade network (the first true maritime trade network) at around 1000 to 600 BC, linking Southeast Asia with East Asia, South Asia, the Middle East, and later East Africa. The route later became part of the Spice trade network and the Maritime Silk Road. The Austronesian traders introduced Austronesian shipbuilding techniques along the route, leading to the development of South Asian outrigger boats, the later adoption of the Chinese of the junk sail, and possibly the development of the fore-and-aft Arabic lateen sail.

China
The naval history of China stems back to the Spring and Autumn period (722 BC–481 BC) of the ancient Chinese Zhou Dynasty. The Chinese built large rectangular barges known as "castle ships", which were essentially floating fortresses complete with multiple decks with guarded ramparts. However, the Chinese vessels during this era were essentially fluvial (riverine). True ocean-going Chinese fleets did not appear until the 10th century Song dynasty.

Mediterranean
There is considerable knowledge regarding shipbuilding and seafaring in the ancient Mediterranean.

1st millennium AD

Austronesia

Large multi-masted seafaring ships of Southeast Asian Austronesians first started appearing in Chinese records during the Han Dynasty as the k'un-lun po or kunlun bo ("ship of the k'un-lun [dark-skinned southern people]"). These ships used two types of sail of their invention, the junk sail and tanja sail. The Chinese recorded that these Southeast Asian ships were hired for passage to South Asia by Chinese Buddhist pilgrims and travelers, because they did not build seaworthy ships of their own until around the 8–9th century AD.

Austronesians (especially from western Island Southeast Asia) were trading in the Indian Ocean as far as Africa during this period. By around 50 to 500 AD, a group of Austronesians, believed to be from the southeastern coasts of Borneo (possibly a mixed group related to the modern Ma'anyan, Banjar, and/or the Dayak people) crossed the Indian Ocean and colonized Madagascar. This resulted in the introduction of outrigger canoe technology to non-Austronesian cultures in the East African coast.

China
The ancient Chinese also built fluvial ramming vessels as in the Greco-Roman tradition of the trireme, although oar-steered ships in China lost favor very early on since it was in the 1st century China that the stern-mounted rudder was first developed. This was dually met with the introduction of the Han Dynasty junk ship design in the same century. The Chinese were using square sails during the Han dynasty and adopted the Austronesian junk sail later in the 12th century. Iconographic remains show that Chinese ships before the 12th century used square sails, and the junk rig of Chinese ships is believed to be developed from tilted sails.

Southern Chinese junks were based on keeled and multi-planked Austronesian ship known as po by the Chinese, from the Old Javanese parahu, Javanese prau, or Malay perahu — large ship. Southern Chinese junks showed characteristics of Austronesian ships that they are made using timbers of tropical origin, with keeled, V-shaped hull. This is different from northern Chinese junks, which are developed from flat-bottomed riverine boats. The northern Chinese junks were primarily built of pine or fir wood, had flat bottoms with no keel, water-tight bulkheads with no frames, transom (squared) stern and stem, and have their planks fastened with iron nails or clamps.

It was unknown when the Chinese people started adopting Southeast Asian (Austronesian) shipbuilding techniques. They may have been started as early as the 8th century, but the development was gradual and the true ocean-going Chinese junks did not appear suddenly. The word "po" survived in Chinese long after, referring to the large ocean-going junks.

Mediterranean
In September 2011, archeological investigations done at the site of Portus in Rome revealed inscriptions in a shipyard constructed during the reign of Trajan (98–117) that indicated the existence of a shipbuilders guild.

Early 2nd millennium AD

Austronesia

Roughly at this time is the last migration wave of the Austronesian expansion, when the Polynesian islands spread over vast distances across the Pacific Ocean were being colonized by the (Austronesian) Polynesians from Island Melanesia using double-hulled voyaging catamarans. At its furthest extent, there is a possibility that they may have reached the Americas. After the 11th century, a new type of ship called djong or jong was recorded in Java and Bali. This type of ship was built using wooden dowels and treenails, unlike the kunlun bo which used vegetal fibres for lashings.

The empire of Majapahit used jong, built in northern Java, for transporting troops overseas. The jongs were transport ships which could carry 100–2000 tons of cargo and 50–1000 people, 28.99–88.56 meter in length. The exact number of jong fielded by Majapahit is unknown, but the largest number of jong deployed in an expedition is about 400 jongs, when Majapahit attacked Pasai, in 1350.

Europe

Until recently, Viking longships were seen as marking an advance on traditional clinker-built hulls where leather thongs were used to join plank boards. This consensus has recently been challenged. Haywood has argued that earlier Frankish and Anglo-Saxon nautical practice was much more accomplished than had been thought and has described the distribution of clinker vs. carvel construction in Western Europe (see map ). An insight into shipbuilding in the North Sea/Baltic areas of the early medieval period was found at Sutton Hoo, England, where a ship was buried with a chieftain. Upward from the keel, the hull was made by overlapping nine strakes on either side with rivets fastening the oaken planks together. It could hold upwards of thirty men.

Sometime around the 12th century, northern European ships began to be built with a straight sternpost, enabling the mounting of a rudder, which was much more durable than a steering oar held over the side. Development in the Middle Ages favored "round ships", with a broad beam and heavily curved at both ends. Another important ship type was the galley, which was constructed with both sails and oars.

The first extant treatise on shipbuilding was written c. 1436 by Michael of Rhodes, a man who began his career as an oarsman on a Venetian galley in 1401 and worked his way up into officer positions. He wrote and illustrated a book that contains a treatise on shipbuilding, a treatise on mathematics, much material on astrology, and other materials. His treatise on shipbuilding treats three kinds of galleys and two kinds of round ships.

China

Shipbuilders in the Ming dynasty (1368~1644) were not the same as the shipbuilders in other Chinese dynasties, due to hundreds of years of accumulated experiences and rapid changes in the Ming dynasty. Shipbuilders in the Ming dynasty primarily worked for the government, under command of the Ministry of Public Works.

During the early years of the Ming dynasty, the Ming government maintained an open policy towards sailing. Between 1405 and 1433, the government conducted seven diplomatic Ming treasure voyages to over thirty countries in Southeast Asia, India, the Middle East and Eastern Africa. The voyages were initiated by the Yongle Emperor, and led by the Admiral Zheng He. Six voyages were conducted under the Yongle Emperor's reign, the last of which returned to China in 1422. After the Yongle Emperor's death in 1424, his successor the Hongxi Emperor ordered the suspension of the voyages. The seventh and final voyage began in 1430, sent by the Xuande Emperor. Although the Hongxi and Xuande Emperors did not emphasize sailing as much as the Yongle Emperor, they were not against it. This led to a high degree of commercialization and an increase in trade. Large numbers of ships were built to meet the demand.

The Ming voyages were large in size, numbering as many as 300 ships and 28,000 men. The shipbuilders were brought from different places in China to the shipyard in Nanjing, including Zhejiang, Jiangxi, Fujian, and Huguang (now the provinces of Hubei and Hunan). One of the most famous shipyards was Long Jiang Shipyard (:zh:龙江船厂), located in Nanjing near the Treasure Shipyard where the ocean-going ships were built. The shipbuilders could built 24 models of ships of varying sizes.

Several types of ships were built for the voyages, including Shachuan (沙船), Fuchuan (福船) and Baochuan (treasure ship) (宝船). Zheng He's treasure ships were regarded as Shachuan types, mainly because they were made in the treasure shipyard in Nanjing. Shachuan, or 'sand-ships', are ships used primarily for inland transport. However, in recent years, some researchers agree that the treasure ships were more of the Fuchuan type. It is said in vol.176 of San Guo Bei Meng Hui Bian (三朝北盟汇编) that ships made in Fujian are the best ones. Therefore, the best shipbuilders and laborers were brought from these places to support Zheng He's expedition.

The shipyard was under the command of Ministry of Public Works. The shipbuilders had no control over their lives. The builders, commoner's doctors, cooks and errands had lowest social status. The shipbuilders were forced to move away from their hometown to the shipyards. There were two major ways to enter the shipbuilder occupation: family tradition, or apprenticeship. If a shipbuilder entered the occupation due to family tradition, the shipbuilder learned the techniques of shipbuilding from his family and is very likely to earn a higher status in the shipyard. Additionally, the shipbuilder had access to business networking that could help to find clients. If a shipbuilder entered the occupation through an apprenticeship, the shipbuilder was likely a farmer before he was hired as a shipbuilder, or he was previously an experienced shipbuilder.

Many shipbuilders working in the shipyard were forced into the occupation. The ships built for Zheng He's voyages needed to be waterproof, solid, safe, and have ample room to carry large amounts of trading goods. Therefore, due to the highly commercialized society that was being encouraged by the expeditions, trades, and government policies, the shipbuilders needed to acquire the skills to build ships that fulfil these requirements.

Shipbuilding was not the sole industry utilising Chinese lumber at that time; the new capital was being built in Beijing from approximately 1407 onwards, which required huge amounts of high-quality wood. These two ambitious projects commissioned by Emperor Yongle would have had enormous environmental and economic effects, even if the ships were half the dimensions given in the History of Ming. Considerable pressure would also have been placed on the infrastructure required to transport the trees from their point of origin to the shipyards.

Shipbuilders were usually divided into different groups and had separate jobs. Some were responsible for fixing old ships; some were responsible for making the keel and some were responsible for building the helm.

 It was the keel that determined the shape and the structure of the hull of Fuchuan Ships. The keel is the middle of the bottom of the hull, constructed by connecting three sections; stern keel, main keel and poop keel. The hull spreads in the arc towards both sides forming the keel.
 The helm was the device that controls direction when sailing. It was a critical invention in shipbuilding technique in ancient China and was only used by the Chinese for a fairly long time. With a developing recognition of its function, the shape and configuration of the helm was continually improved by shipbuilders. The shipbuilders not only needed to build the ship according to design, but needed to acquire the skills to improve the ships.

After 1477, the Ming government reversed its open maritime policies, enacting a series of isolationist policies in response to piracy. The policies, called Haijin (sea ban), lasted until the end of the Ming dynasty in 1644. During this period, Chinese navigation technology did not make any progress and even declined in some aspect.

Indian Ocean
In the Islamic world, shipbuilding thrived at Basra and Alexandria. The dhow, felucca, baghlah, and the sambuk became symbols of successful maritime trade around the Indian Ocean from the ports of East Africa to Southeast Asia and the ports of Sindh and Hind (India) during the Abbasid period.

Early modern

Bengal
Mughal Empire had a large shipbuilding industry, which was largely centred in the Bengal Subah. Economic historian Indrajit Ray estimates shipbuilding output of Bengal during the sixteenth and seventeenth centuries at 223,250 tons annually, compared with 23,061 tons produced in nineteen colonies in North America from 1769 to 1771. He also assesses ship repairing as very advanced in Bengal.

Shipbuilding in Bengal was advanced compared to European shipbuilding at the time, with Bengal selling ships to European firms. An important innovation in shipbuilding was the introduction of a flushed deck design in Bengal rice ships, resulting in hulls that were stronger and less prone to leak than the structurally weak hulls of traditional European ships built with a stepped deck design. The British East India Company later duplicated the flushed deck and hull designs of Bengal rice ships in the 1760s, leading to significant improvements in seaworthiness and navigation for European ships during the Industrial Revolution.

West Africa
Documents from 1506, for example, refer to watercraft on the Sierra Leone river carrying 120 men. Others refer to Guinea coast peoples using war canoes of varying sizes – some 70 feet in length, 7–8 feet broad, with sharp pointed ends, rowing benches on the side, and quarterdecks or forecastles build of reeds. The watercraft included miscellaneous facilities, such as cooking hearths, and storage spaces for the crew's sleeping mats.

From the 17th century, some kingdoms added brass or iron cannons to their vessels. By the 18th century, however, the use of swivel cannons on war canoes accelerated. The city-state of Lagos, for instance, deployed war canoes armed with swivel cannons.

Europe
With the development of the carrack, the west moved into a new era of ship construction by building the first regular oceangoing vessels. In a relatively short time, these ships grew to an unprecedented size, complexity, and cost.

Shipyards became large industrial complexes, and the ships built were financed by consortia of investors. These considerations led to the documentation of design and construction practices in what had previously been a secretive trade run by master shipwrights and ultimately led to the field of naval architecture, in which professional designers and draftsmen played an increasingly important role. Even so, construction techniques changed only very gradually. The ships of the Napoleonic Wars were still built more or less to the same basic plan as those of the Spanish Armada of two centuries earlier, although there had been numerous subtle improvements in ship design and construction throughout this period. For instance, the introduction of tumblehome, adjustments to the shapes of sails and hulls, the introduction of the wheel, the introduction of hardened copper fastenings below the waterline, the introduction of copper sheathing as a deterrent to shipworm and fouling, etc.

Industrial Revolution

Though still largely based on pre-industrial era materials and designs, ships greatly improved during the early Industrial Revolution period (1760 to 1825), as "the risk of being wrecked for Atlantic shipping fell by one-third, and of foundering by two thirds, reflecting improvements in seaworthiness and navigation respectively." The improvements in seaworthiness have been credited to "replacing the traditional stepped deck ship with stronger flushed decked ones derived from Indian designs, and the increasing use of iron reinforcement." The design originated from Bengal rice ships, with Bengal being famous for its shipbuilding industry at the time. Iron was gradually adopted in ship construction, initially to provide stronger joints in a wooden hull e.g. as deck knees, hanging knees, knee riders and the other sharp joints, ones in which a curved, progressive joint could not be achieved. One study finds that there were considerable improvements in ship speed from 1750 to 1850: "we find that average sailing speeds of British ships in moderate to strong winds rose by nearly a third. Driving this steady progress seems to be the continuous evolution of sails and rigging, and improved hulls that allowed a greater area of sail to be set safely in a given wind. By contrast, looking at every voyage between the Netherlands and East Indies undertaken by the Dutch East India Company from 1595 to 1795, we find that journey time fell only by 10 percent, with no improvement in the heavy mortality, averaging six percent per voyage, of those aboard."

Initially copying wooden construction traditions with a frame over which the hull was fastened, Isambard Kingdom Brunel's  of 1843 was the first radical new design, being built entirely of wrought iron. Despite her success,  and the great savings in cost and space provided by the iron hull, compared to a copper-sheathed counterpart, there remained problems with fouling due to the adherence of weeds and barnacles. As a result, composite construction remained the dominant approach where fast ships were required, with wooden timbers laid over an iron frame (Cutty Sark is a famous example). Later Great Britains iron hull was sheathed in wood to enable it to carry a copper-based sheathing.  Brunel's  represented the next great development in shipbuilding. Built-in association with John Scott Russell, it used longitudinal stringers for strength, inner and outer hulls, and bulkheads to form multiple watertight compartments. Steel also supplanted wrought iron when it became readily available in the latter half of the 19th century, providing great savings when compared with iron in cost and weight. Wood continued to be favored for the decks.

During World War II, the need for cargo ships was so great that construction time for Liberty ships went from initially eight months or longer, down to weeks or even days. They employed production line and prefabrication techniques such as those used in shipyards today. The total number of dry-cargo ships built in the United States in a 15-year period just before the war was a grand total of two. During the war, thousands of Liberty ships and Victory ships were built, many of them in shipyards that didn't exist before the war. And, they were built by a workforce consisting largely of women and other inexperienced workers who had never seen a ship before (or even the ocean).

Worldwide shipbuilding industry 

After World War II, shipbuilding (which encompasses the shipyards, the marine equipment manufacturers, and many related service and knowledge providers) grew as an important and strategic industry in a number of countries around the world. This importance stems from:
 The large number of skilled workers required directly by the shipyard, along with supporting industries such as steel mills, railroads and engine manufacturers; and
 A nation's need to manufacture and repair its own navy and vessels that support its primary industries

Historically, the industry has suffered from the absence of global rules  and a tendency towards (state-supported) over-investment due to the fact that shipyards offer a wide range of technologies, employ a significant number of workers, and generate income as the shipbuilding market is global.

Japan used shipbuilding in the 1950s and 1960s to rebuild its industrial structure; South Korea started to make shipbuilding a strategic industry in the 1970s, and China is now in the process of repeating these models with large state-supported investments in this industry. Conversely, Croatia is privatising its shipbuilding industry.

As a result, the world shipbuilding market suffers from over-capacities, depressed prices (although the industry experienced a price increase in the period 2003–2005 due to strong demand for new ships which was in excess of actual cost increases), low profit margins, trade distortions and widespread subsidisation. All efforts to address the problems in the OECD have so far failed, with the 1994 international shipbuilding agreement never entering into force and the 2003–2005 round of negotiations being paused in September 2005 after no agreement was possible. After numerous efforts to restart the negotiations these were formally terminated in December 2010.  The OECD's Council Working Party on Shipbuilding (WP6) will continue its efforts to identify and progressively reduce factors that distort the shipbuilding market.

Where state subsidies have been removed and domestic industrial policies do not provide support in high labor cost countries, shipbuilding has gone into decline. The British shipbuilding industry is a prime example of this with its industries suffering badly from the 1960s. In the early 1970s British yards still had the capacity to build all types and sizes of merchant ships but today they have been reduced to a small number specialising in defence contracts, luxury yachts and repair work. Decline has also occurred in other European countries, although to some extent this has reduced by protective measures and industrial support policies. In the US, the Jones Act (which places restrictions on the ships that can be used for moving domestic cargoes) has meant that merchant shipbuilding has continued, albeit at a reduced rate, but such protection has failed to penalise shipbuilding inefficiencies. The consequence of this is that contract prices are far higher than those of any other country building oceangoing ships.

Present day shipbuilding
Beyond the 2000s, China, South Korea, Japan have dominated world shipbuilding by completed gross tonnage.  China State Shipbuilding Corporation, China Shipbuilding Industry Corporation, Hyundai Heavy Industries, Samsung Heavy Industries, Daewoo Shipbuilding & Marine Engineering and Imabari Shipbuilding supply most of the global market for large container, bulk carrier, tanker and Ro-ro ships.

When referring to the type, then China, South Korea and Japan are the producing countries of the carrier ships as mentioned above. While Italy, France, Finland and Germany and other country in Europe are the makers of cruise ships (the most), icebreakers, crane vessel and so on.

The market share of European ship builders began to decline in the 1960s as they lost work to Japan in the same way Japan most recently lost their work to South Korea and China. Over the four years from 2007, the total number of employees in the European shipbuilding industry declined from 150,000 to 115,000. In 2022, some key shipbuilders in Europe are Fincantieri, Damen Group, Naval Group and BAE Systems.

The output of the United States also underwent a similar change. The US is ranked the 10th largest shipbuilder worldwide. The top companies that build large naval vessels, such as aircraft carriers and frigates, include Huntington Ingalls, Bollinger and General Dynamics. In the small to medium military vessels category, key shipbuilders include Vigor Industrial, and VT Halter Marine. As the US Navy is shifting to a new fleet architecture that is more widely distributed, Unmanned Surface Vehicles (USVs) development is rapidly propelled to higher priority. Key strategic Program of Record includes prototyping and construction of up to 9 MUSVs, for which a sole contract was awarded to L3Harris Technologies, who partnered with Swiftships to build the MUSVs.

2018 Defense Department initiated Overlord Program, and developed USV Prototypes 1 (NOMAD) and 2 (RANGER). Both of them took part in multiple fleet level exercises and demonstrations, traveled 28,982 nautical miles in autonomous mode, and tested numerous payloads. Nomam, formerly known as Riley Claire, is a converted offshore patrol vessel, which was built by Swiftships. The objective of the Ghost Fleet Overlord program is to convert large, commercial vessels to autonomous systems.

Modern shipbuilding manufacturing techniques

Modern shipbuilding makes considerable use of prefabricated sections. Entire multi-deck segments of the hull or superstructure will be built elsewhere in the yard, transported to the building dock or slipway, then lifted into place. This is known as "block construction". The most modern shipyards pre-install equipment, pipes, electrical cables, and any other components within the blocks, to minimize the effort needed to assemble or install components deep within the hull once it is welded together. 

Ship design work, also called naval architecture, may be conducted using a ship model basin. Previously, loftsmen at the mould lofts of shipyards were responsible for taking the dimensions, and details from drawings and plans and translating this information into templates, battens, ordinates, cutting sketches, profiles, margins and other data. However, since the early 1970s computer-aided design became normal for the shipbuilding design and lofting process.

Modern ships, since roughly 1940, have been produced almost exclusively of welded steel. Early welded steel ships used steels with inadequate fracture toughness, which resulted in some ships suffering catastrophic brittle fracture structural cracks (see problems of the Liberty ship). Since roughly 1950, specialized steels such as ABS Steels with good properties for ship construction have been used. Although it is commonly accepted that modern steel has eliminated brittle fracture in ships, some controversy still exists. Brittle fracture of modern vessels continues to occur from time to time because grade A and grade B steel of unknown toughness or fracture appearance transition temperature (FATT) in ships' side shells can be less than adequate for all ambient conditions.

As modern shipbuilding panels on a panel line become lighter and thinner, the laser hybrid welding technique is utilized. The laser hybrid blend focuses a higher energy beam on the material to be joined, allowing it to keyhole with a much higher depth to width ratio than comparative traditional welding techniques. Typically a MIG process trails the keyhole providing filler material for the weld joint. This allows for very high penetration without excessive heat input from decreased weld metal deposited leading to less distortion and welding at higher travel speeds.

Ship repair industry

All ships need repair work at some point in their working lives. A part of these jobs must be carried out under the supervision of the classification society.

A lot of maintenance is carried out while at sea or in port by ship's crew.
However, a large number of repair and maintenance works can only be carried out while the ship is out of commercial operation, in a ship repair yard.

Prior to undergoing repairs, a tanker must dock at a deballasting station for completing the tank cleaning operations and pumping ashore its slops (dirty cleaning water and hydrocarbon residues).

See also
 Ancient shipbuilding techniques
 Boat building
 List of shipbuilders and shipyards
 List of the largest shipbuilding companies
 List of Russian marine engineers

References

Notes

External links
 Shipbuilding Picture Dictionary
 U.S. Shipbuilding—extensive information about the U.S. shipbuilding industry, including over 500 pages of U.S. shipyard construction records
 Shipyards United States—from GlobalSecurity.org
 Shipbuilding News
 Bataviawerf – the Historic Dutch East Indiaman Ship Yard—Shipyard of the historic ships Batavia and Zeven Provincien in the Netherlands, since 1985 here have been great ships reconstructed using old construction methods.
 Photos of the reconstruction of the Dutch East Indiaman Batavia —Photo web site about the reconstruction of the Batavia on the shipyard Batavia werf, a 16th-century East Indiaman in the Netherlands. The site is constantly expanding with more historic images as in 2010 the shipyard celebrates its 25th year.

 
 
 
Naval architecture